North Junín Quechua is a language dialect of Quechua spoken throughout the Andean highlands of the Northern Junín and Tarma Provinces of Perú. Dialects under North Junín Quechua include Tarma Quechua spoken in Tarma Province and the subdialect San Pedros de Cajas Quechua. North Junín Quechua belongs to the Yaru Quechua dialect cluster under the  Quechua I dialects. Initially spoken by Huancas and neighboring native people, Quechua's Junín dialect was absorbed by the Inca Empire in 1460 but relatively unaffected by the Southern Cuzco dialect. The Inca Empire had to defeat stiff resistance by the Huanca people.

After the Spanish conquered the Inca Empire, bilingual speakers emerged as well as a variety of loanwords, introducing the sounds o and e. A debate whether Quechua has three or five vowel phonemes subsequently emerged concerning whether Quechua has /e/ and /o/ as separate phonemes. For example, Spanish borrowed kula meaning "coca leaves, coca bush" in Quechua to yield the word cola. This example illustrates a change of u to o when used in Spanish.
Translation of Spanish Catholic texts into Quechua led to a flowering period; yet, a series of failed rebellions near the end of the eighteenth century caused a declaration of insubordination directed at the Quechua language. Spanish replaced Quechua in schools starting from the 1970s.

Currently listed as an endangered language, San Pedros de Cajas dialect of Quechua has been under study and found in use mainly at home with Spanish being used in schools. A survey conducted in a secondary school resulted in only one out of fifty students answering that he/she used Quechua at home.

Recent work by linguists have focused on tracing the origin of Quechua by comparing the reconstructed language, Proto- Quechua, with Proto-Aymaran. There exist arguments on both sides as Paul Heggarty argues against a distant relationship. Similarities have been found to span both proto-languages from reconstruction of a variety of Quechua dialects; commonalities include apa- meaning "to carry," picqa meaning "five," urqu meaning "mountain," and qipa meaning "before (space), after (time)," all words in Junín Quechua. Qipa exemplifies relative temporal marking rather than tense marking.

An agglutinating language, Quechua has been analyzed by sub-grouping its copious morphemes together, particularly its suffixes. A feature of Junín Quechua and Quechua I, which includes North Junín dialect, belongs to characterization of non-final suffixes. Willem Adelaar has conducted extensive work on Quechua dialects and has published findings on the Tarma dialect.

Linguistic Analyses

Morphemes 

The suffixes of verbs in basically every Quechua I dialect subdivides into final and non-final suffixes. North Junín Quechua holds a division of non-final verb suffixes into the left and right block. The right block, usually inflectional, participates in similar fashion to final verb suffixes in allowing long vowels. The left block merges (and co-lexicalizes) with verb roots such that its non-final verb suffixes can be both derivational and inflectional. A prescribed order affects the right-block suffixes such that, for a causative suffix, morphemes occur in a specified order regardless of their relationship to the subject. Vowel length can change meaning in ways including but not limited to marking first person, marking causation, and marking pronouns. These relationships form a structural explanation for Tarma Quechua's agglutinating script.

Tarma Quechua possesses some unique changes to the directional morphemes that denote "Up," "Down," "In," and "Out." The "Down" morpheme "rpu" exists as a left hand block suffix and has productively led to "lpu" meaning overcoming resistance in addition to simplification to "ru."

Phonemes 

For an inventory of phonemes of both Tarma and San Juan de Cajas dialects see  and  respectively. The de-aspiration of the phoneme tʃ, i.e. tʃ' -> tʃ, has been noted. In addition, stops do not have aspiration or glottalization, but can be voiced; as discussed earlier, vowel length can be phonemic.

The Tarma dialect has 3 vowels: /a, i, u/. All vowels have long equivalents, and North Junin displays contrastive vowel length. The consonant chart is from the Tarma dialect.

The variety of Tarma spoken in San Pedro de Cajas lacks a voiced bilabial stop /b/ and adds a voiceless uvular fricative /χ/.

Nominalization 
We observe that nominalized clauses can be case marked entirely. The Huanca dialect of North Junin Quechua allows case marking of nominal clauses as the genitive case, restricted in most other Quechua dialects. Furthermore, the nominal clauses only mark relative temporal differences, i.e. no tense marking.

References 

Quechuan languages
Languages of Peru